Vyacheslav Trukhno (born February 22, 1987) is a Russian professional ice hockey player. Trukhno was selected by the Edmonton Oilers in the 4th round (120th overall) of the 2005 NHL Entry Draft.

He was playing for KHL Medveščak in the Erste Bank Eishockey Liga until 2012.

Awards and honours
QMJHL All-Rookie Team (2004–05)
Canadian Major Junior All-Rookie Team (2004–05)
QMJHL First All-Star Team (2006–07)

Career statistics

Regular season and playoffs

International

References

External links

1987 births
Living people
Bakersfield Condors (1998–2015) players
Edmonton Oilers draft picks
Gatineau Olympiques players
KHL Medveščak Zagreb players
Luleå HF players
P.E.I. Rocket players
People from Khimki
Russian ice hockey centres
Springfield Falcons players
Djurgårdens IF Hockey players
Lørenskog IK players
Nippon Paper Cranes players
Sportspeople from Moscow Oblast